Schuster ("shoemaker", "cobbler") is a common family name in German. It is also common among Ashkenazi-Jews, sometimes spelled as "Shuster".

People 

 Blessed Alfredo Ildefonso Schuster (1880–1954), Italian cardinal and Archbishop of Milan
 Alon Schuster (born 1957), Israeli politician
 Armin Schuster (born 1961), German politician
 Arnold Schuster (1927–1952), murdered businessman
 Arthur Schuster (1851–1934), German-born British physicist
 Assaf Schuster (born 1958), Israeli entrepreneur and professor of computer science 
 Augusto Schuster (born 1992), Chilean actor, singer, dancer and model
 Bernd Schuster (born 1959), German footballer and former manager of Real Madrid
 Sir Claud Schuster (1869–1956), British civil servant
 Dirk Schuster (born 1967), German former footballer and football manager
 Eugenia Schuster (1865-1946), American community activist 
 František Schuster, Czech sports shooter
 Franz Schuster (1904–1943),(de) Austrian member of the resistance
 George Ernest Schuster (1881–1982), British colonial administrator and politician of German descent
 Gary Schuster (born 1946), American chemist
 Guido Schuster, Swiss computer-scientist
 Hans-Emil Schuster (born 1934), German astronomer
 Jérôme Schuster (born 1985), French rugby union player
 Josef Schuster (born 1954), Israeli-born German physician and current President of the Central Council of Jews in Germany
 Joseph Schuster (1903–1969), Russian-Jewish cellist
 Joseph Schuster (1748–1812), German composer
JuJu Smith-Schuster (born 1996) NFL Football Player
 Leo Frank Schuster (1852–1927), British patron of the arts
 Leon Schuster (born 1951), South African film maker, singer and radio presenter
 M. Lincoln Schuster (1897-1970), American businessman and co-founder of Simon & Schuster
 Norman Schuster (born 1979), German boxer
 Peter Schuster (born 1941), Austrian theoretical chemist
 Peter Schuster, Samoan-New Zealand rugby union player and Chairman of the Samoa Rugby Union
 Rudolf Schuster (born 1934), Slovak president from 1999 to 2004
 Shlomit C. Schuster (1951-2016), Israeli philosophical counselor
 Werner Schuster (1939–2001), German politician
 Werner Schuster (born 1969), Austrian ski jumping coach and a former ski jumper
 Wolfgang Schuster (born 1949), German jurist, Lord Mayor of Stuttgart from 1997-2013 (CDU)

Other 

 Benjamin and Marian Schuster Performing Arts Center
 Simon & Schuster, New York publishing house
 Schuester
 Shuster
 Šustr

References

German-language surnames
Jewish surnames
Occupational surnames